Michael Lynn Davison (August 4, 1945 – May 11, 2013) was an American professional baseball player. Davison was a left-handed pitcher whose career (1964–1965; 1969–1971) was interrupted by three years of service in the army 1969–1972. He appeared in 32 games over two seasons (1969–1970) for the San Francisco Giants of Major League Baseball.

Davison was born in Galesburg, Illinois. He graduated from Springfield High School in Springfield, Minnesota in 1963 and attended Augsburg College before signing his first pro contract with the Baltimore Orioles in 1964. Drafted out of the Oriole system by the Giants that winter, he played for one season with the 1965 Springfield Giants of the Double-A Eastern League, then entered military service. When he resumed his career, in 1969, he converted from a starting pitcher to a reliever. Called up by the Giants at the end of the season, he pitched in one game for them in 1969, then in 31 more from June 5, 1970, through the end of the season — all in relief.

Overall, Davison allowed 48 hits and 22 bases on balls in 38 MLB innings pitched, with 23 strikeouts, three victories and one save.

After retiring, Davison was active as a member of the Major League Baseball Players Alumni Association.

Death
Davison died on May 11, 2013, at Glencoe Regional Health Services Long Term Care in Glencoe, Minnesota. He was 67 years old.

References

External links

1945 births
2013 deaths
Major League Baseball pitchers
San Francisco Giants players
Indianapolis Indians players
Springfield Giants players
Aberdeen Pheasants players
Elmira Pioneers players
Amarillo Giants players
Phoenix Giants players
Augsburg Auggies baseball players
Baseball players from Minnesota
People from Galesburg, Illinois
United States Army soldiers